The Passenger Amenities Committee (PAC) is a statutory Organization body under the Ministry of Railways (India), Government of India. It is tasked with grievances of passengers for the ease of railway transport in India. PAC is considered to be one of the classical organizational network for smooth functioning of railways in India.

Works at Karaikudi Railway station 

 Replacement of old coaches in Chennai and Coimbatore-bound express trains with new one
 Additional coaches in Chennai – Sengottai Silambu Express.
 Forwarded a proposal for scheduled stop at Karaikudi for the Rameswaram Ayodhya Express.
 Proposal for separate berths for Karaikudi passengers on Chennai-bound express trains.

People
Syed Ahmad Hashmi formerly served as the chairman of the PAC.

References 

Ministry of Railways (India)
Government agencies of India
Passenger rail transport in India